USS Celeritas (SP-665) was a United States Navy patrol vessel in commission from 1917 to 1919.

Designed by the firm of Swasey, Raymond, & Page, Celeritas was built as a private motorboat of the same name by Robert Jacobs at City Island in the Bronx, New York, in 1916 for David Goodrich for his use in commuting. Goodrich later sold her to R. B. Myer of New York City.

On 28 May 1917, the U.S. Navy purchased Celeritas from Myer for use as a section patrol boat during World War I. She was commissioned on 29 May 1917 as USS Celeritas (SP-665).

Assigned to the 2nd Naval District in southern New England, Celeritas carried out patrol duties for the rest of World War I.

Celeritas was stricken from the Navy Directory on 17 May 1919 and sold on 25 June 1919.

Notes

References
 
 Department of the Navy Naval History and Heritage Command Online Library of Selected Images: Civilian Ships: Celeritas (American Motor Boat, 1916). Served as USS Celeritas (SP-665) in 1917–1919
 NavSource Online: Section Patrol Craft Photo Archive Celeritas (SP 665)

Patrol vessels of the United States Navy
World War I patrol vessels of the United States
Ships built in City Island, Bronx
1916 ships